Béla Tóth was a Hungarian professional football manager who managed the Turkey national team.

Managerial career
Tóth managed the Turkey national football team from 1927 to 1932. He made his managerial debut in a set of matches against Bulgaria in June 1927, tying 3-3 and winning the rematch with a score of 3-1. He participated in the 1928 Summer Olympics with the Turkish national team. He was dismissed on 17 April 1932 after a streak of 4 consecutive losses. In total, he managed Turkey for 8 matches and had a record of 2 wins 1 draw and 5 losses, with 14 goals scored and 25 conceded.

References

Year of birth missing
Year of death missing
Hungarian football managers
Turkey national football team managers
Hungarian expatriate football managers
Hungarian expatriate sportspeople in Turkey
Expatriate sportspeople in Turkey